Þorgils gjallandi (1 June 1851 – 23 June 1915) was an Icelandic author born in the hamlet of Skútustaðir by Mývatn, a lake in the Skútustaðahreppur rural municipality.

His name at birth was Jón Stefánsson, but he adopted the name "Þorgils gjallandi" as his nom de plume. The name is taken from the epic Egils Saga. The original Þorgils gjallandi was a servant in the household of Þórólfr, who was the elder son of Kveldúlfr and the paternal uncle of Viking poet Egill Skallagrímsson; gjallandi is not a proper name but an epithet meaning "the yelling" or "the bellowing."

Many of his stories relate the achievements of nonconformist people who lacked the professional standing to silence their antagonists.

Early years
Jón Stefánsson lived his whole life in the county of Suður-Þingeyjar and from 1890 was director of a poor-law parish (hreppur) there. Only twice did he travel outside the county boundaries.

He was the eldest child of Stefán Helgason (1822–1868) and Guðrún Ólafsdóttir (1816–1860). He had three full siblings, all of whom died in early childhood: Stefán (b. 1856) died the day after his birth, and Pétur (b. 1853) and Hólmfríður (b. 1857) both passed away in 1860, a few months before their mother's death. Jón's father remarried in 1862, to Sigurbjörg Jónsdóttir, and they had four children: Pétur, Guðrún, Helgi and Hólmfríður. Jón was only 17 when his father also died. Inheriting the farmstead, he worked the land for a year and then began working as a servant on a series of farms in the county; he worked the longest for a younger brother of his late father, Hjálmar Helgason (1833–1916), and his wife Sigríður Vilhelmína Pétursdóttir (1843–1928).

In 1877 he married Guðný Jakobína Pétursdóttir (1850–1939), the daughter of Pétur Jónsson, a Reykjahlíð farmer. They had a son who died in infancy, followed by two daughters, Guðrún (1880–1943) and Védís (1885–1963). By 1889 Jón and his family had acquired a cottage at Litluströnd, where they lived to the end of their days.

Writing career
Þorgils gjallandi was one of the most determined personalities in Icelandic literature; he was a simple farmer and entirely self-taught in the craft of writing. His early writings can be found in the Mývatn-area rural newspapers of the 1880s and 1890s.

His protagonists, motivated not by moral purity but by carnal needs, impelled by nature and their circumstances, seek love not in eternal ideals but in an expansive passion that is at one and the same time profligate and guileless, which he conceived of as the nature of mankind.

Thorgils's love stories are also tragedies, because his characters cannot be in a state of nature and live together under conditions that require self-denial and social inhibition. The foremost reason, from his point of view, is that with its moral rules the community has terrified man, transforming us from vigorous and powerful animals, steered by our natural desires, into revolting beasts, cunning and duplicitous.

Thorgils's collection Ofan úr sveitum ("Above the countryside") was published in 1892. Until that time, he had had to keep hidden his most radical, realistic stories, which represented for most people in the country a major stumbling block to his acceptance. In 1902 the novel Upp við Fossa ("Up to the waterfall") came out, but as before it did not appeal to the tastes of his readership.

Although some critics regarded his writing as destructive and unsuitable for homes with children and young people, it was not ordained that he should retreat to obscurity; after all, since 1893 he had written several animal stories that the public could easily appreciate. In 1910 he published a selection of these stories under the name Dýrasögur 1 ("Animal Stories 1").

In addition to these works, he wrote many other stories and articles and lectured on various topics.

Works

Novels
 1902: Upp við fossa ("Up to the waterfall"). 
 Gamalt og nýtt ("Old and new")

Short stories
 "Aftanskin" ("Twilight")
 "Bernskuminning" ("Memory of childhood")
 "Brestur" ("Breaking")
 "Ef Guð lofar" ("If God permits")
 "Einar Andrésson"
 "Frá Grími á Stöðli"
 "Fölskvi" ("Falsity")
 "Gísli húsmaður" ("Gísla the house servant")
 "Í minni hluta" ("In the minority")
 "Kapp er best með forsjá" ("Strive best with foresight")
 "Karl í Kothúsi" ("The cottager")
 "Leidd í kirkju" ("Led to church")
 "Ósjálfræði" ("Dependence")
 "Seingróin sár" ("A sore slow to heal")
 "Séra Sölvi" ("Reverend Sölvi")
 "Skírnarkjóllinn" ("The baptismal gown")
 "Snæfríðar þáttur" ("About Snæfríður")
 "Vetrarblótið á Gaulum"
 "Við sólhvörf" ("At the solstice")
 "Þjóðólfsþáttur" ("About Þjóðólfur")

Notes

External links
 

1851 births
1915 deaths
Þorgils gjallandi